In enzymology, a phosphatidylcholine desaturase (previously EC 1.3.1.35) is an enzyme that catalyzes the chemical reaction

1-acyl-2-oleoyl-sn-glycero-3-phosphocholine + NAD+  1-acyl-2-linoleoyl-sn-glycero-3-phosphocholine + NADH + H+

Thus, the two substrates of this enzyme are 1-acyl-2-oleoyl-sn-glycero-3-phosphocholine and NAD+, whereas its 3 products are 1-acyl-2-linoleoyl-sn-glycero-3-phosphocholine, NADH, and H+.

This enzyme belongs to the family of oxidoreductases, specifically those acting on the CH-CH group of donor with NAD+ or NADP+ as acceptor.  The systematic name of this enzyme class is 1-acyl-2-oleoyl-sn-glycero-3-phosphocholine:NAD+ Delta12-oxidoreductase. Other names in common use include oleate desaturase, linoleate synthase, oleoyl-CoA desaturase, and oleoylphosphatidylcholine desaturase.

References 

 
 
 

EC 1.14.19
NADH-dependent enzymes
Enzymes of unknown structure